Mennonite Meetinghouse (Germantown Mennonite Church) is a historic Mennonite church building at 6119 Germantown Avenue in Philadelphia, Pennsylvania.

The first settlers in Germantown in 1683 were Dutch or Germans recruited by William Penn.  Most of the settlers had a Mennonite background but joined the Quaker meeting.  By about 1690 several families attended non-Quaker services and they built a log church in 1708.  This church was the first Mennonite Church in America.  William Rittenhouse was the first minister.  The log church was replaced by the present church at the same site in 1770, constructed by Jacob Knorr.

It was added to the National Register of Historic Places in 1973.

References

External links
Germantown Mennonite Historic Trust (Official Website)

Properties of religious function on the National Register of Historic Places in Philadelphia
Historic American Buildings Survey in Philadelphia
Churches in Philadelphia
Mennonitism in Pennsylvania
Historic district contributing properties in Pennsylvania
Germantown, Philadelphia
Churches on the National Register of Historic Places in Pennsylvania